Veselovo is a rural locality (a village) in Petushinskoye Rural Settlement, Petushinsky District, Vladimir Oblast, Russia. The population was 7 as of 2010. There are 3 streets.

Geography 
Veselovo is located on the Bolshaya Lipnya River, 25 km north of Petushki (the district's administrative centre) by road. Svintsovo is the nearest rural locality.

References 

Rural localities in Petushinsky District